is a 2005 Japanese film directed by Ataru Oikawa.

Cast
 Mayuko Iwasa
 Megumi Komatsu
 Rina Akiyama
 Rina Koike
 Seiji Fukushi
 Tomorowo Taguchi

References

2005 films
Films directed by Ataru Oikawa
2000s Japanese films